Martina ("Tineke") Maria Hofland (born 14 January 1954 in The Hague, South Holland) is a former breaststroke swimmer from the Netherlands, who competed for her native country at the 1972 Summer Olympics in Munich, West Germany. There she was eliminated in the qualifying heats of the 100m Breaststroke, clocking 1:19.38.

References
 Dutch Olympic Committee

1954 births
Living people
Dutch female breaststroke swimmers
Olympic swimmers of the Netherlands
Swimmers at the 1972 Summer Olympics
Swimmers from The Hague